Shafaq is a cave located 140 km east of Shiraz, near Meymand, Iran. It is a caving destination in Fars province that features stalagmites and stalactites, and lies within a mountain with two entrances eastward into the cave. The cave is noted for the refraction of light that occurs in the cave when sunlight breaks on the cave's porticos, producing colorful beams at sunrise. The end of the cave has not yet been detected.
Nearby Meymand village is also noted for its fragrant flower gardens.

References

Caves of Iran
Firuzabad County
Landforms of Fars Province